Monika Pulch (born 23 May 1949) is a German fencer. She competed at the 1968 and 1972 Summer Olympics.

References

1949 births
Living people
German female fencers
Olympic fencers of West Germany
Fencers at the 1968 Summer Olympics
Fencers at the 1972 Summer Olympics
Sportspeople from Essen